Obtained Enslavement was a black metal band from Stord, Norway. They formed in 1989 and decided to split up in 2000 because Pest moved to the United States, and they did not succeed in finding a new singer. The most notable members, Pest and Torgrim Øyre, have also been members of the black metal band Gorgoroth.

Discography

Demos
Obtained Enslavement (1992 demo)
Out Of The Crypts (1994 demo)

LPs

 Centuries of Sorrow (1994 LP) CD re-issue by Vic Records 2011, plus the 2 demos
 Witchcraft (1997 LP)
 Soulblight (1998 LP)
 The Shepherd and the Hounds of Hell (2000 LP)

External links 
My Space fanpage

Norwegian black metal musical groups
Musical groups established in 1989
1989 establishments in Norway
Musical groups disestablished in 2000
2000 disestablishments in Norway
Musical groups from Hordaland
Musicians from Stord